Hypselobarbus is a genus of fish in the family Cyprinidae endemic to India.

Species
There are currently 26 recognized species in this genus:
 Hypselobarbus basavarajai Arunachalam, Chinnaraja & Mayden, 2016 
 Hypselobarbus bicolor Knight, A. Rai, D'souza, Philip & Dahanukar, 2016 
 Hypselobarbus canarensis (Jerdon, 1849) 
 Hypselobarbus carnaticus (Carnatic carp) (Jerdon, 1849) 
 Hypselobarbus curmuca (Curmuca barb) (F. Hamilton, 1807) 
 Hypselobarbus dobsoni (Krishna carp) (F. Day, 1876)
 Hypselobarbus dubius (Nilgiris barb) (F. Day, 1867) 
 Hypselobarbus gracilis (Jerdon, 1849) 
 Hypselobarbus jerdoni (Jerdon's carp) (F. Day, 1870) 
 Hypselobarbus keralaensis Arunachalam, Chinnaraja & Mayden, 2016 
 Hypselobarbus kolus (Sykes, 1839) 
 Hypselobarbus kurali Menon & Rema Devi, 1995 
 Hypselobarbus kushavali Arunachalam, Chinnaraja, Sivakumar & Mayden, 2016 
 Hypselobarbus lithopidos (F. Day, 1874) 
 Hypselobarbus maciveri (Annandale, 1919) 
 Hypselobarbus menoni Arunachalam, Chinnaraja, Chandran & Mayden, 2014 
 Hypselobarbus micropogon (Korhi barb) (Valenciennes, 1842) 
 Hypselobarbus mussullah (Sykes, 1839) 
 Hypselobarbus nasutus  Arunachalam, Chinnaraja & Mayden, 2016 
 Hypselobarbus nilgiriensis 
Hypselobarbus nitidus Plamoottil & Vineeth, 2022  (Kerala Beauty)
 Hypselobarbus periyarensis (B. S. Raj, 1941)
  Hypselobarbus procerus  Plamoottil, 2021  (Attappady Barb)
 Hypselobarbus pseudomussullah Arunachalam, Chinnaraja & Mayden, 2016 
 Hypselobarbus pulchellus (F. Day, 1870) 
 Hypselobarbus tamiraparaniei Arunachalam, Chinnaraja, Chandran & Mayden, 2014 
 Hypselobarbus thomassi (F. Day, 1874) 
 Hypselobarbus vaigaiensis Arunachalam, Chinnaraja, Chandran & Mayden, 2014

References

 
Cyprinidae genera
Cyprinid fish of Asia
Endangered fish

Taxa named by Pieter Bleeker